Fritz Rössler (17 January 1912 – 11 October 1987) was a low-level official in the Nazi Party who went on to become a leading figure in German neo-Nazi politics. In his later life he was more commonly known as Dr. Franz Richter.

Nazi activity
Rössler was born in Bad Gottleuba-Berggießhübel, Saxony. After attending university in Dresden (where he did not complete a degree), Rössler became a Nazi in 1930 and soon became a technical adviser to the Gau of Saxony where he specialized in plans for resettlement of the East. By the end of World War II, Rössler was heading up the main office of the Ministry of Public Enlightenment and Propaganda before fleeing the Eastern Front to Saarland.

Dr. Franz Richter
As the war came to an end, Rössler emerged in Hanover where he claimed to be Dr. Franz Richter, a Sudeten German teacher. The ruse was accepted, and Rössler moved to Luthe in Saxony where he found teaching work. Fired from his position in 1949 for teaching the Stab-in-the-back legend, he soon joined the Deutsche Rechtspartei and its successor the Deutsche Reichspartei. Bearing a passing resemblance to Adolf Hitler due to his toothbrush moustache and habit of wearing Jodhpurs and jackboots, he was elected to the Bundestag in the 1949 election but was expelled from the party the following year due to his radical Nazi ideals and his habit of attending parliament drunk.

Along with a number of other expellees from the DRP, he was a founder member of the Socialist Reich Party, which called for a restoration of Germany's historic borders and "National-Socialist fundamental principles". Continuing to sit in the Bundestag, he made a notoriously anti-Semitic speech in November 1951 and was arrested soon afterwards for forging documents. In the course of investigations it was uncovered that Dr. Franz Richter was in fact Fritz Rössler, and he was sentenced to 18 months in prison for the forgery, on top of a three-month sentence for insulting Lower Saxon ministers and breaching electoral regulations.

As Richter he also built up a close relationship with the British Union Movement, distributing Mosleyite literature across Germany, whilst also establishing the All German Representations "pen club" to arrange contacts between British activists and German followers of Europe a Nation.

Later years
Involved with the European Social Movement, Rössler was expelled from the SRP before it was banned, and after his release from prison he moved to Cairo, where a number of neo-Nazis operatives were based, and adopted the name Achmed Rössler. He returned to Germany in 1966 and became a businessman in Essen. He died at age 75 in Radstadt, Austria.

References

External links
Report on the discovery of Rössler's faked identity

1912 births
1987 deaths
People from Sächsische Schweiz-Osterzgebirge
Nazi Party politicians
Deutsche Rechtspartei politicians
Socialist Reich Party politicians
German neo-Nazis
Members of the Bundestag for Lower Saxony
Nazi propagandists
German nationalists